Yanko (Bulgarian: Янко) is a surname and given name. It is a Bulgarian version of the Serbo-Croatian Janko, Hebrew Janka, or Belarusian Yanka. The name may refer to the following notable people:

Given name
Yanko Angelov (born 1993), Bulgarian football midfielder
Yanko Bratanov (born 1952), Bulgarian sprinter
Yanko Daucik (1941–2017), Slovak football player
Yanko Georgiev (born 1988), Bulgarian football goalkeeper
Yanko Kirilov (born 1946), Bulgarian football midfielder
Yanko Kosturkov (born 1982), Bulgarian football player
Yanko Radanchev (born 1957), Bulgarian gymnast
Yanko Rusev (born 1958), Bulgarian weightlifter 
Yanko Sakazov (1860–1941), Bulgarian socialist politician
Yanko Sandanski (born 1988), Bulgarian football midfielder
Yanko Shopov (born 1954), Bulgarian wrestler
Yanko Tihov (born 1977), British and Bulgarian painter and printmaker
Yanko Valkanov (born 1982), Bulgarian football defender

Surname
Arik Yanko (born 1991), Israeli association football player
Kennedy Yanko, American artist
Lika Yanko (1928–2001), Bulgarian artist
Yuriy Yanko, Ukrainian music conductor

See also
 Yanko (disambiguation)

Bulgarian-language surnames
Bulgarian masculine given names